Vadim Ishmakov (born 30 August 1979) is a retired Ukrainian footballer.

External links
 
 

1979 births
Living people
Ukrainian footballers
Association football defenders
Ukrainian expatriate footballers
Expatriate footballers in Belarus
FC Torpedo Zaporizhzhia players
SC Tavriya Simferopol players
FC Tytan Armyansk players
FC Dynamo Brest players
FC Krymteplytsia Molodizhne players
FC Krystal Kherson players
FC Baranovichi players
Ukrainian First League players
Ukrainian Second League players
Footballers from Zaporizhzhia